Lane Allred is an American politician and a Republican member of the Wyoming House of Representatives representing the 21st district since January 10, 2023.

Political career
When incumbent Republican representative Evan Simpson announced his retirement, Allred declared his candidacy and won the Republican primary on August 16, 2022 with 59% of the vote, defeating fellow Republican candidate Jeremiah Hardesty. He then won the general election on November 8, 2022 unopposed.

References

External links
Profile from Ballotpedia

Living people
Republican Party members of the Wyoming House of Representatives
Brigham Young University alumni
University of Phoenix alumni
21st-century American politicians
People from Afton, Wyoming
Year of birth missing (living people)